Lifestyle journalism is the field of journalism that provides news and opinion, often in an entertaining tone, regarding goods and services used by consumers in their everyday life. Lifestyle journalism covers travel, fashion, fitness, leisure, food, and arts, among other topics.

See also 
 List of women's magazines
 List of men's magazines

References

Further reading 

Journalism by field
Types of journalism